Kopaniec may refer to the following places in Poland:
Kopaniec, Lower Silesian Voivodeship (south-west Poland)
Kopaniec, West Pomeranian Voivodeship (north-west Poland)